Fredriech Pretorius (born 4 August 1995) is a South African track and field athlete specialising in the decathlon. He was the bronze medallist at the 2015 African Games before becoming continental champion at the 2016 African Championships in Athletics.

Competition record

References

Living people
1995 births
South African decathletes
South African male athletes
Commonwealth Games competitors for South Africa
Athletes (track and field) at the 2014 Commonwealth Games
Athletes (track and field) at the 2015 African Games
African Games bronze medalists for South Africa
African Games medalists in athletics (track and field)